Charles O. Hucker (June 21, 1919 – November 18, 1994) was a professor of Chinese language and history at the University of Michigan. He was regarded as one of the foremost historians of Imperial China and a leading figure in the promotion of academic programs in Asian Studies during the 1950s and 1960s.

Career
Born in St. Louis, Hucker graduated from the University of Texas, and served in the United States Army Air Forces during the Second World War, where he rose to the rank of major and was awarded the Bronze Star. He completed a Ph.D. in Chinese language from the University of Chicago, was a fellow of the Rockefeller Foundation, a senior fellow of the National Endowment for the Humanities, and a frequent consultant to the U.S. Office of Education, foundations, and various colleges and universities. Hucker was awarded an honorary doctorate of humanities from Oakland University in 1974. Before joining the University of Michigan in 1965 where he was the chair of the Department of Far Eastern Languages and Literatures, Hucker taught at the University of Chicago, the University of Arizona, and Oakland University. Throughout his teaching career, Hucker was an active member of many professional associations. Hucker was among a small number of American scholars of Chinese history who visited scholarly centers in China in 1979 under the joint auspices of the U.S. National Academy of Sciences and the Chinese Academy of Social Sciences.

At the time of his retirement from the University of Michigan in 1983, Hucker was regarded as one of the foremost historians of imperial China and a leading promoter of academic programs in Asian Studies during the 1950s and 1960s. In his honor, the university established the Charles O. Hucker professorship in the Department of Asian Languages and Cultures. Hucker was particularly noted for his A Dictionary of Official Titles in Imperial China, regarded as the most comprehensive guide to traditional Chinese government in a Western language, as well as his study of the Censorial system in Ming Dynasty China. He also wrote China's Imperial Past, a general history of Imperial China. He was a contributor to the Encyclopædia Britannica, Encyclopedia Americana, and The Cambridge History of China. His China to 1850: A Short History, published in 1975, was widely used as a college text.

In retirement, Hucker and his wife, the former Myrl Henderson, whom he wed in 1943, lived in Tucson, Arizona, where he was a volunteer in schools and hospitals. Hucker also wrote plays and short stories, several of which have been published or produced. Hucker died on November 14, 1994, in Odessa, Texas, at the age of 75. In addition to his wife, Hucker was survived by a brother and a sister.

Published works
 The Traditional Chinese State in Ming Times, 1368-1644. Tucson: University of Arizona Press, 1961 
 The Censorial System of Ming China. Stanford: Stanford University Press, 1966 
 China's Imperial Past: An Introduction to Chinese History. Stanford: Stanford University Press, 1975
 The Ming Dynasty: Its Origins and Evolving Institutions. Ann Arbor: University of Michigan Center for Chinese Studies, 1978
 China to 1850: A Short History. Stanford: Stanford University Press, 1978
 A Dictionary of Official Titles in Imperial China. Stanford: Stanford University Press, 1985

References

Citations

Sources

External links
  
 Harvard online version of Charles Hucker's A Dictionary of Official Titles in Imperial China

1994 deaths
1919 births
Historians of China
United States Army Air Forces personnel of World War II
University of Texas at Austin alumni
University of Chicago alumni
University of Arizona faculty
Oakland University faculty
University of Michigan faculty
United States Army Air Forces officers
20th-century American dramatists and playwrights
20th-century American historians
20th-century American male writers
American male non-fiction writers